Temperatures Rising is an American television sitcom that aired for two years on the ABC network, during which time it was presented in three different formats and cast line-ups with a total of 46 episodes. The series was originally developed, produced, and occasionally directed by William Asher for Ashmont Productions and Screen Gems and premiered on September 12, 1972, in the time slot of Tuesday nights at 8:00 PM. The regular cast consisted of Cleavon Little as Dr. Jerry Noland, Joan Van Ark as Nurse Annie Carlisle, Reva Rose as Nurse Mildred "Millie" MacInerny, Nancy Fox as Student Nurse Ellen Turner, and James Whitmore as Dr. Vincent Campanelli. The premise of the series featured Campanelli as the no-nonsense chief-of-staff of Capitol General, a (fictional) Washington, D.C. hospital, who is forced to deal with the outlandish antics of Noland and the three nurses, whom Campanelli refers to as "the four horsemen of aggravation". Reruns of the season's episodes continued until September 4, 1973.

Despite heavy competition in the ratings from Maude on CBS and Bonanza on NBC, Temperatures Rising did well enough in its first season to be renewed for a second. For this second season, John Mitchell, the head of Screen Gems, decided to replace James Whitmore with comedian Paul Lynde, whose own sitcom, The Paul Lynde Show (also produced by William Asher for the 1972–73 season) was to be cancelled. Asher was against the change and declined to continue with Temperatures Rising, resulting in him being replaced as producer by Duke Vincent and Bruce Johnson. Under them, Van Ark, Rose, and Fox were dropped from the cast along with Whitmore, thus retaining Little as the only returning member. After only two episodes, Morrow was replaced by John Dehner as Dr. Charles Cleveland Claver. In this season Mercy was presented as the penny-pinching chief-of-staff, with his nagging mother as the owner of the hospital. Little's character was changed to the chief surgeon and "the only sane member of this medical madhouse". 

The ratings for the show were poor and, as a result, Mitchell asked Asher to return to the series as the producer and restore it to its original format—albeit with Paul Lynde continuing in the lead. For the third format of the series—which reverted to the original title of Temperatures Rising—Bond, Cason, Darling, Dehner, and Houser were dropped from the cast while Lynde and Little continued as, respectively, Dr. Mercy and Dr. Nolan. Added to the line-up were Alice Ghostley as Nurse Edwina Moffitt, sister of Dr. Mercy, and Barbara Rucker as Nurse Kelly, while Nancy Fox, from the first-season cast, returned as Nurse Ellen Turner.

Series overview

Episodes

Season 1: Temperatures Rising (1972–73)
Starring Cleavon Little as Dr. Jerry Noland, Joan Van Ark as Nurse Annie Carlisle, Reva Rose as Nurse Mildred "Millie" MacInerny, Nancy Fox as Student Nurse Ellen Turner, and James Whitmore as Dr. Vincent Campanelli. Beginning part-way through the season, Bernie Kopell appeared in three episodes as orderly Harold Lefkowitz.

Temperatures Rising was pre-empted twice during its initial run.  The first was on November 7, 1972, for the presidential election; the second was on January 23, 1973, for the NBA All-Star Game.  The broadcast of December 26, 1972, was a rerun of "Operation Fastball", the series' second episode.

Reruns of Temperatures Rising were broadcast on a regular basis from April 3 to September 4, 1973.  During this period the series was preempted three times: April 24 for the animated special Cricket in Times Square, June 19 for the musical special Roberta Flack: The First Time Ever, and July 17 for Chicago in the Rookies.  In between the last rerun of the first season and the first episode of the second season ABC aired two specials: Furst Family of Washington on September 11, 1973, and Egan on September 18, 1973.

Season 2 (original run): The New Temperatures Rising Show (1973–74)
Starring Paul Lynde as Dr. Paul Mercy, Sudie Bond as Martha Mercy, Barbara Cason as Miss Tillis, Jennifer Darling as Nurse Windy Winchester, John Dehner as Dr. Charles Cleveland Claver, Jeff Morrow as Dr. Lloyd Axton, and Cleavon Little as Dr. Jerry Noland.  Jerry Houser has a recurring role as an intern named Haskell.

The New Temperatures Rising Show was pre-empted on October 23, 1973, by the TV-movie The President's Plane is Missing, and on November 27, 1973, by The World Turned Upside Down.  The broadcast of January 1, 1974, was a rerun of "The Mothers", the sixth episode of the season.  On January 15, 1974, The New Temperatures Rising Show was replaced in its Tuesday time-slot by a new series, Happy Days.

Season 2 (summer replacement): Temperatures Rising (1974)
Starring Paul Lynde as Dr. Paul Mercy, Alice Ghostley as Nurse Edwina Moffitt, Nancy Fox as Nurse Ellen Turner, Barbara Rucker as Nurse Kelly, and Cleavon Little as Dr. Jerry Noland.

References

External links
 Temperatures Rising at the Internet Movie Database
 William Asher discussing Temperatures Rising (proceed to part nine)

Lists of American sitcom episodes